LSCB may refer to:

 Lake St. Croix Beach, Minnesota, United States
 Local Safeguarding Children Board, a public policy board
 LSCB (language), the language of the deaf communities of urban Brazil